Bernard Béréau (or Béreau; 4 October 1940 – 2 January 2005) was a French professional footballer who played as a defender.

After football 
After retiring, Béréau became a physiotherapist for a club in Saint-Jean-de-Luz.

Honours 
Paris Saint-Germain
 Division 2: 1970–71

Notes

References

External links 
 

1940 births
2005 deaths
Sportspeople from Pyrénées-Atlantiques
French footballers
Association football defenders
Racing Club de France Football players
CA Paris-Charenton players
Stade Saint-Germain players
Paris Saint-Germain F.C. players
Entente Bagneaux-Fontainebleau-Nemours players
Ligue 2 players
French Division 3 (1971–1993) players
Ligue 1 players
French physiotherapists
Championnat de France Amateur (1935–1971) players
Footballers from Nouvelle-Aquitaine